KNNG (104.7 FM, King FM) is a radio station broadcasting a top 40 music format. Licensed to Sterling, Colorado, United States, the station is currently owned by Wayne Johnson, through licensee Media Logic LLC, and features programming from Premiere Networks.

History
The station was assigned the call letters KSTC-FM on 5 January 1979.  On 1 March 1985, the station changed its call sign to the current KNNG.
KNNG started out playing top 40 music.  In 1990 KNNG segued to a very soft adult contemporary format.  The station also aired hourly news and farm information. Throughout the next 25 years the station had a series of flips from Adult Contemporary to country music to top 40.  Most recently KNNG now plays hit music with a rhythmic approach.  It is Northwest Colorado's home for Ryan Seacrest's American Top 40.

References

External links
 

NNG
Sterling, Colorado